Sangkulirang is a town and sub district of East Kutai Regency, East Kalimantan, Indonesia. The town lies in the northern part of the Makassar Strait and at the base of the Mangkalihat Peninsula. Sangkulirang is situated in the delta of the Karangan River, which forms the Sangkulirang bay on the east coast of Borneo. Most of the regency is vegetated with mangrove forest and has some notable karst areas with steep limestone cliffs.

References

Populated places in East Kalimantan
East Kutai Regency